Ambroz is place name in Spain. It is also a given name and surname in the Serbo-Croatian language derived from Ambrosius, with an alternative spelling .

Ambroz or Ambróz may refer to:

People
 Ambroz Haračić (1855-1916), Croatian botanist

Places
 Ambroz (Madrid), a former administrative neighborhood of Madrid
 Ambroz River, Portugal
 Ambroz Valley, Portugal

See also
Equivalent given and surnames in other languages include:
 Ambrose (disambiguation), English
 Ambros, German
 Ambroš (disambiguation), Croatian
 Ambrus (disambiguation), Hungarian
 Ambrogio, Italian
 Amvrosy, Russian
 Ambroży, Polish
 Ambróz (disambiguation), Slovakian
 Ambrož (disambiguation), Slovenian and Czech
 Ambrosio (disambiguation), Spanish